Antes de que Cuente Diez (English: Before I Count to Ten) is the fifth studio album by Spanish rock band Fito & Fitipaldis. It was published by DRO in 2009.

Track listing

Chart performance

Certifications

Reception

According to Allmusic, Antes de que Cuente Diez is indisputably an accomplished record, but it is also content with repeating a by-now familiar formula.

References 

2009 albums
Fito & Fitipaldis albums
Spanish-language albums